The British Martin-Baker MB 5 was the ultimate development of a series of prototype fighter aircraft built during the Second World War. Neither the MB 5 nor its predecessors ever entered production, despite what test pilots described as excellent performance.

Design and development
Martin-Baker Aircraft began the MB 5 as the second Martin-Baker MB 3 prototype, designed to Air Ministry Specification F.18/39 for an agile, sturdy Royal Air Force fighter, able to fly faster than 400 mph. After the first MB 3 crashed in 1942, killing Val Baker, the second prototype was delayed. A modified MB 3 with a Rolls-Royce Griffon engine, rather than the Napier Sabre of the MB 3, was planned as the MB 4, but a full redesign was chosen instead.

The redesigned aircraft, designated MB 5, used wings similar to the MB 3, but had an entirely new steel-tube fuselage. Power came from a Rolls-Royce Griffon 83 liquid-cooled V-12 engine, producing 2,340 hp (1,745 kW) and driving two three-bladed contra-rotating propellers. Armament was four 20 mm Hispano cannon, mounted in the wings outboard of the widely spaced retractable undercarriage. A key feature of the design was ease of manufacture and maintenance: much of the structure was box-like, favouring straight lines and simple conformation. It was built under the same contract that covered the building of the MB 3.

Flight testing
The first flight of the MB 5 prototype, serial R2496, took place on 23 May 1944. Performance was considered outstanding by test pilots, and the cockpit layout was praised by the Aeroplane and Armament Experimental Establishment (A&AEE). The accessibility of the fuselage for maintenance was excellent, thanks to a system of detachable panels.

Acknowledged as one of the best aerobatic pilots in the UK, S/L Janusz Żurakowski from the A&AEE at RAF Boscombe Down gave a spectacular display at the Farnborough Air Show in June 1946, with the Martin-Baker MB 5, an aircraft he considered superlative and better in many ways than the Spitfire.

If serial production had been authorised, the aircraft would have served over Germany during the Second World War. Instead, the RAF directed its attention towards jet-powered fighters. The Rolls-Royce Griffon engine failed when the MB 5 was being demonstrated to Prime Minister Winston Churchill, the Chief of the Air Staff and a host of other VIPs at an important display of British and captured German aircraft at Farnborough. Michael Bowyer states that Martin-Baker may have lacked both facilities and sufficient government support to engage in large-scale production. The company's slow progress with the machine could have been due to a lack of facilities.

The original MB 5 was reputedly destroyed on a gunnery range. Martin-Baker went on to become one of the world's leading builders of ejection seats.

Replica construction
A partial replica was built in Reno, Nevada, USA by John Marlin using wings from a P-51 Mustang. By April 2017 the replica had been completed and was for sale. It was built 6 ft shorter than the original, and may not be in flyable condition.

Specifications (MB 5, as designed)

See also

References
Notes

Bibliography

 Bowyer, Michael J.F. Interceptor Fighters for the Royal Air Force 1935–45. Wellingborough, UK: Patrick Stephens Ltd., 1984. .
 Buttler, Tony. Secret Projects: British Fighters and Bombers 1935–1950 (British Secret Projects 3). Leicester, UK: Midland Publishing, 2004. .
 Brown, Captain Eric. Wings of the Weird & Wonderful, Volume 1. London: Airlife, 1983. .
 Donald, David. "Martin-Baker Fighters." Wings of Fame, Vol. 9, 1997, Aerospace Publishing Ltd., ISSN 1361-2034.
 Green, William, ed. "Mr. Martin's Memorable M.B.5." Air International Vol. 16, no. 2, February 1979.
 Green, William. War Planes of the Second World War: Fighters, Volume Two. London, Macdonald & Co. (Publishers) Ltd., 1961.
 Green, William and Swanborough, Gordon. WW2 Fact Files: RAF Fighters, Part 2. London: Macdonald and Jane's Publishers Ltd., 1979. .
 Jane, Fred T. "The Martin-Baker F.18/39." Jane's Fighting Aircraft of World War II. London: Studio, 1946.  .
 Zuk, Bill. Janusz Zurakowski: Legends in the Sky. St. Catharine's, Ontario: Vanwell, 2004. .

External links

 MB 5 at martin-baker.com
 "The Martin-Baker M-B V" a 1945 Flight article on the MB 5

Martin-Baker aircraft
1940s British fighter aircraft
Cancelled military aircraft projects of the United Kingdom
Aircraft with contra-rotating propellers
Individual aircraft of World War II
Single-engined tractor aircraft
Aircraft first flown in 1944